The 1907 Baltimore mayoral election saw the election of J. Barry Mahool.

General election
The general election was held May 7.

References

Baltimore mayoral
Mayoral elections in Baltimore
Baltimore